Ostrovo is a village in Croatia, municipality Markušica, Vukovar-Syrmia County.

Education
Branch school of Elementary school Markušica is located in Ostrovo. Education at local schools is carried out in Serbian.

History
Ostrovo was mentioned in 1381 when it was described as a ruined town. During the Middle Ages it was a typical swampland castle.

During the war in Croatia Ostrovo was within self-proclaimed Serb political entity SAO Eastern Slavonia, Baranja and Western Syrmia. In the final stages of conflict United Nations Mission conducted peaceful reintegration this region into Croatian jurisdiction.

Demographic history
According to the 1991 census, the village was inhabited by a majority of Serbs (85.18%), and minority of Croats (7.91%) and Yugoslavs (4.29%).

Gallery

See also
Markušica Municipality

References

Populated places in Vukovar-Syrmia County
Populated places in Syrmia
Joint Council of Municipalities
Serb communities in Croatia